Opalkovo is a small settlement west of Velike Lašče in central Slovenia. The entire Municipality of Velike Lašče is included in the Central Slovenia Statistical Region and is part of the traditional region of Lower Carniola.

Name
The name Opalkovo is derived from the verb opaliti 'to singe, burn off', referring to land that was cleared for settlement.

References

External links
Opalkovo on Geopedia

Populated places in the Municipality of Velike Lašče